Colonial elections were held in South Australia from 10 November to 28 November 1862. All 36 seats in the South Australian House of Assembly were up for election.

This election was called after only two years, and followed increased instability in government. In 1861, the Colony saw five different governments: Richard Hanson was replaced by Thomas Reynolds, who re-shuffled his personnel, only to be replaced by George Waterhouse, who also carried out a re-shuffle. The instability convinced the Governor that the best solution was an early election.

There were nine by-elections in the inter-election period.

There was a redistribution carried out for this election. The basis of representation was changed to 18 electorates of two members each, with no increase in the total membership of the Assembly.

Since the inaugural 1857 election, no parties or solid groupings had been formed, which resulted in frequent changes of the Premier. If for any reason the incumbent Premier of South Australia lost sufficient support through a successful motion of no confidence at any time on the floor of the house, he would tender his resignation to the Governor of South Australia, which would result in another member deemed to have the support of the House of Assembly being sworn in by the Governor as the next Premier.

Informal groupings began and increased government stability occurred from the 1887 election. The United Labor Party would be formed in 1891, while the National Defence League would be formed later in the same year.

See also
Premier of South Australia

Notes

References
History of South Australian elections 1857-2006, volume 1: ECSA
Statistical Record of the Legislature 1836-2007: SA Parliament

Elections in South Australia
1862 elections in Australia
1860s in South Australia
November 1862 events